Nels Edwin Nelson (September 7, 1917 – July 13, 1992) was a Canadian politician who served as a New Democratic Party member of the House of Commons of Canada. He was a teacher by career.

Nelson made two attempts to become a Member of Parliament at Alberta's Wetaskiwin riding in the 1965 and 1968 federal elections.

He was first elected at the Burnaby—Seymour riding in the 1972 general election and served in the 29th Canadian Parliament, but was defeated there by Marke Raines of the Liberal Party in the 1974 federal election and made no further attempts to return to federal office.

On 13 July 1992, Nelson died of a heart attack in Vancouver.

References

External links
 

1917 births
1992 deaths
Members of the House of Commons of Canada from British Columbia
New Democratic Party MPs
American emigrants to Canada
People from Shoshone County, Idaho